St. Goban, St. Gobban, or St. Gobhan is the name of various Saints of early Christian Ireland. However the ecclesiastic integrity and merit of the Saint(s) is often debased by confusing, composite attempted  biographies. However, by applying objectivity (philosophy) to the analysis of references in pertinent hagiography and eminent biographies we can reach a constructive conclusion; that the number of references to a St. Gobban far outweighs those of a St. Goban.   and that the references to St.Gobban link this saint to St Laserian's Cathedral, Old Leighlin plus Killamery:Cell Lamraidhe and identify this saint as Gobban Find mac Lugdach alternatively  anglicized as St. Gobhan.

The Biographical References 
1) "Monasticon Hibernicum Or the Monastical History of Ireland". (John Stevens:1722) cites five references to St.Gobban and 1 reference to St. Goban.

2) "An ecclesiastical history of Ireland". (John Lanigan:1829) cites eight references to St.Gobban and one reference to St.Goban.

3) "Journal of the Royal Antiquaries of Ireland". (1861) cites one reference to St.Gobban and none for a St.Goban.

Analysis of the references overwhelming cite a St. Gobban associated with:

a) Old Leighlin:seanleithglinn County Carlow.

b) Killamery:Cell Lamraidhe  County Kilkenny.

c) Seagoe:teg-da-goba'.  County Armagh.

 The Martyrology of Oengus 
"The Martyrology of Oengus"  states “of Gobban of Cell Lamraide in Hui Cathrenn in the west of Ossory, a thousand monks it had, as experts say and of them was Gobban." Also from the now lost Annals of Cloneagh-"A.D. 639. St. Gobban, who founded the monastery of Old Leighlin, and afterwards resigned it to St. Laserian, retiring in 632 to Killamery in Ossory,(Kingdom of Ossory) died this year and was interred at Clonenagh. His feast was observed on 6 December. Gobban's feast, a shout of thousands, with a train of great martyrdom, angelic wall, abbot of virginity, lucid descendant of Lane."

 Gobanus - Gobban-Goba 

The distinguished Irish Church historian John Lanigan states - "Gobanus – Goba of Teg da-goba – Seagoe, on the bank of the Bann in Iveagh of Ulidia (also) St. Gobanus of Killamery, near the mountain called Slievenaman.''" Lanigan clearly states that he believes the Gobanus(Latin) - St.Gobban of Killamery is the same historical person as St. Gobhan  of Seagoe, who is identified as Gobban Find mac Lugdach.

Gobans without attribution 

That there existed in the early history of Ireland  another St. Goban / Gobban is undeniable. The Kinsale area of County Cork lays claim to a St. Goban / Gobban as does County Antrim; however without proper research and attribution any attempt to properly identify may only add confusion and detract from known facts.

References 

Medieval Irish saints
Medieval Gaels from Ireland